The Smurfs Dance Party is a dance rhythm game developed by Japanese studio Land Ho! and published by Ubisoft for the Wii as a spin-off title to the Just Dance Kids series. The game was released on July 19, 2011, in North America, July 29, 2011 in Europe and September 8, 2011, in Australia.

The game has gained extra attention because it was originally scheduled as an Xbox 360 and PlayStation 3 title with a require of Kinect and PlayStation Move in addition to the Wii, but development for the Xbox 360 and PlayStation 3 was abandoned and The Smurfs Dance Party was released for the Wii alone.

Gameplay
The gameplay is similar to the concept Ubisoft dance franchise Just Dance, The Smurfs Dance Party allows players to dance alongside Papa Smurf, Clumsy Smurf, Brainy Smurf, Grouchy Smurf, Gutsy Smurf, Smurfette and Gargamel. The game also includes a Story Mode, which is based by the events of the film, The Smurfs, and features 8 songs.

Track list 
The track list consists of 25 songs.

Reception
The Smurfs Dance Party received an overall score of 3.0/10 from Gameplay Today, stating "The Smurfs Dance Party had the makings of a sleeper hit for the simple fact that it was a dance game being made by the people who brought us Just Dance and Just Dance 2. The lineage means nothing here though because this game couldn’t be farther from its successful "smurfless" cousins." In 2021, the game became an internet meme as users would post the meme onto TikTok.

References

2011 video games
Dance video games
Music video games
Cancelled Xbox 360 games
Cancelled PlayStation 3 games
Just Dance (video game series)
Ubisoft games
Video games based on films
Video games developed in Japan
The Smurfs video games
Wii games
Wii-only games
Sony Pictures video games
Multiplayer and single-player video games